Dr. Gunwantrao Rambhau Sarode was a former Indian politician who was a member of the 10th and the 11th national Lok Sabhas. He represented the Jalgaon Constituency of Maharashtra and was a member of the Bharatiya Janata Party. He was also a member of the Maharashtra Legislative Assembly for the Raver constituency in Jalgaon district.

References

People from Maharashtra
India MPs 1991–1996
Marathi politicians
Bharatiya Janata Party politicians from Maharashtra
Lok Sabha members from Maharashtra
People from Jalgaon district
India MPs 1996–1997
1940 births
2018 deaths